Steatoda albomaculata is a species of cobweb spider in the family Theridiidae. It is found in North America, Europe and Russia, North Africa, Israel, Kazakhstan, Iran, Central Asia, China, Korea, Japan.

Subspecies
These two subspecies belong to the species Steatoda albomaculata:
 Steatoda albomaculata albomaculata (De Geer, 1778) i g
 Steatoda albomaculata infuscata (Schenkel, 1925) i c g
Data sources: i = ITIS, c = Catalogue of Life, g = GBIF, b = Bugguide.net

References

Further reading

 

Steatoda
Articles created by Qbugbot
Spiders described in 1778